Kopey-Kubovo (Käpäy-Qobaw) is a rural locality (a selo) and the administrative centre of Kopey-Kubovsky Selsoviet, Buzdyaksky District, Bashkortostan, Russia. The population was 949 as of 2010. There are 7 streets.

Geography 
Kopey-Kubovo is located 19 km southwest of Buzdyak (the district's administrative centre) by road. Karanbash is the nearest rural locality.

References 

Rural localities in Buzdyaksky District